Jawaharpur Vidyut Utpadan Nigam Ltd is an upcoming thermal power plant coming up at Town Malawan district Etah in Uttar Pradesh, India. The power plant is one of the coal-based power plants of Jawaharpur Vidyut Utpadan Nigam Ltd. (JVUNL), a 100% subsidiary of UP Rajya Vidyut Utpadan Nigam Limited (UPRVUNL)

The Contract was awarded to Doosan Power Systems India (DPSI).

Capacity
The planned capacity of the power plant is 1320 MW (2x660MW). Expected commissioning in year 2021.

Media

See also 

 Uttar Pradesh Rajya Vidyut Utpadan Nigam

References

Coal-fired power stations in Uttar Pradesh
Etah district
Energy infrastructure completed in 2021
2021 establishments in Uttar Pradesh